Last Term at Malory Towers is a children's novel in the school story genre written by Enid Blyton. It is the sixth and final book written by Blyton in her Malory Towers series and, like the previous books in the series, follows Darrell Rivers at the eponymous girls' boarding school.

Plot summary
In her final year, Darrell returns to Malory Towers for her final term. She is now Head Girl at the school.

After taking the new girls to Miss Grayling's study,  the two agree that the only real failure in Darrell's year is Gwendoline. Darrell undertakes to do what she can to set her on a more positive path. 

The girls discuss their futures: Mary-Lou wants to train as a children's nurse, Clarissa and Bill plan to open a riding school close to Malory Towers, Belinda will train to be an artist and Irene will study music. Darrell, Sally, Alicia and Betty hope to go to university. Gwen boasts that she will be going to a finishing school in Switzerland. To the other girls' disgust, she boasts about the cruel and unkind exchanges she had with her father to emotionally blackmail him into agreeing to her plans. 

New girl include Amanda Chartelow and Suzanne, Mam'zelle Rougier's niece.
Amanda is tall and physically strong, and plans to compete in the Olympic Games. She is dismissive of the games culture at Malory Towers, saying that there is a second former at the school with outstanding potential whom nobody has noticed. When Moira, now Games Captain, challenges her, she names June. Amanda undertakes to coach June in tennis and swimming, predicting that she will be in the school second teams by the end of the term. June  realises that Amanda's motive is to be proved right, rather than any personal interest in her, but accepts Amanda's offer. However Amanda's tough training regime soon leads to friction between them, and June gives up.

Darrell invites Gwen to her study for a talk in an attempt to fulfil her promise to Miss Grayling. Gwen is sulky and obstinate, and finally maliciously tells Darrell that she is glad that she has made her father miserable: "It will teach him a lesson!" Darrell, appalled, reports her failure to Miss Grayling, who  predicts that a terrible punishment is in store for Gwen.  

Jo Jones in the Second Form is unpopular because of her loud and boastful behaviour. Her father is similarly loud and boorish. Jo is given five pounds pocket money by him, which she loses. It is found by Matron, but Jo is unwilling to claim it since it is more than the girls are permitted to have. Jo decides to take the money from Matron's office, but inadvertently takes nine pounds instead of five. Later, in a separate incident, the entire Second Form is punished when Jo fails to own up to breaking a school rule. An exasperated form punishes Jo by sending her to Coventry.

Jo decides to run away from the school, taking her friend, the weak and easily influenced first former Deirdre Parker. Soon afterwards, Miss Grayling is told by the police that two of the stolen notes have been presented at local shops by two Malory Towers girls.  It soon  becomes clear that these are Jo and Deirdre, who are soon found and brought back to the school. Miss Grayling sees Deirdre first, and recognising genuine contrition, asks Matron to deal with her.  Miss Grayling tells them that Jo must leave the school, making it clear that, in her view, Jo has been failed by her parents. Jo's father agrees.

Amanda wants to swim in the open sea, but  underestimates the strength of the currents and finds herself in danger of being dashed against the rocks. She is rescued by June, but sustains injuries that end her Olympic ambitions. Amanda and June are reconciled. June renews her sports practice while a more mellow Amanda contemplates a future as a games mistress and sports coach. 

Gwen is shocked when she is told that her father is seriously ill and may die, and re-evaluates her future: she will not be going to a finishing school in Switzerland and she bitterly recalls her cruel treatment of her father. She leaves the school and later writes to Darrell, showing a very different side:

 I shall never be as strong-minded as you, Darrell - or Sally - or Bill and Clarissa - but I don't think I'll ever again be as weak and selfish as I was. You see - it wasn't too late after all. And that has made a lot of difference to me. I feel as if I've been given another chance.

The term draws to a close. In an emotional ending, Alicia takes June by the shoulders and asks her to carry on and hold the standard high. Startled, June agrees. Unprompted, Felicity makes the same promise to Darrell.

Style and themes

The final book brings the main characters' story arcs to a conclusion. Minor characters such as Mavis and Catherine have either left the school or, in the case of Daphne, have disappeared from the narrative.

The Second Form is more prominent in this book, with Darrell and most of the other Sixth Formers having little to do beyond reacting to Gwen's latest display of selfishness. New girl Suzanne, Mam'zelle Dupont's niece, is developed minimally as a character and serves mainly as a means for Blyton's recurring habit of giving a French character mispronounced English words. She is the prototype for the more successful Claudine in the later St. Clares school series. 

There is a "pride before a fall" theme to the final book. Amanda, Jo and Gwendoline are all boastful and unpleasant in their various ways.  Gwen is particularly obnoxious in this story, prompting Miss Grayling to predict that a terrible punishment awaits her.

The portrayal of the Jones family is an example of the class bias for which Blyton was frequently criticised. Mr Jones is depicted as loud, boorish and implicitly a self made nouveau riche barrow boy, while his wife is depicted as tastelessly "dripping in diamonds." The normally exemplary Headmistress, Miss Grayling, discusses confidential details concerning Jo Jones with other parents in a way that would be unlikely to be appropriate even in 1951:

"It was an experiment, taking Jo - but I'm afraid it's not an experiment that's going to work out well. We've had other experiments before, as you know - taking girls that don't really fit in, hoping they will, later. And so far they always have done, in a marvellous way. I think Jo would too, if only she got a little backing from her parents. But Jo's father always undoes any good we do here for Jo!"

In Jo's case, her father's part in her downfall is not in doubt, and they depart the school sadder and wiser people. For all three girls there is a redemption, in the typical Blyton style. Letters from both Jo and Gwendoline after their departures are contrite and warmly written, giving the reader hope for their characters' futures.

Characters

North Tower Sixth Form girls
Darrell Rivers - the main protagonist of the stories
Sally Hope - Darrell's best friend, solid and dependable
Gwendoline Mary Lacey - spoiled, lazy, boastful and conceited
Alicia Johns - lively and quick-witted, always ready with a sharp-tongued opinion
Mary-Lou - now taller, but still timid
Maureen Little - new girl following the closure of her old school
Moira Linton - hard and domineering, Fifth Form Head Girl
Wilhelmina (Bill) Robinson - still obsessed with horses and particularly her own horse, "Thunder"
Clarissa Carter - Bill's best friend
Irene - a scatterbrained girl who excels at music and mathematics
Belinda Morris - Irene's best friend, equally scatterbrained, a talented artist
Amanda Chartelow - new girl, tall and physically strong with ambitions to compete in the Olympic Games

Other girls
Betty Hill - Alicia's friend in West Tower
Felicity Rivers - Darrell's younger sister, in the Second Form
June - Alicia's cousin, in the Second Form
Susan - Felicity's friend in the Second Form
Jo Jones - spoilt and selfish in the Second Form
Deidre - friend of Jo in the First Form

Mistresses and Staff
Miss Grayling - Headmistress of Malory Towers.
Miss Potts - House Mistress of North Tower and mistress of the First Form.
Miss Oakes - Sixth Form mistress
Miss Peters - Third Form mistress
Miss Parker - Second Form mistress
Mam'zelle Dupont - French mistress, described as "short, fat and round," with a jolly temperament
Mam'zelle Rougier - French mistress, described as "thin and sour," with an ill-humoured temperament
Matron - North Tower Matron, responsible for the well-being of the girls boarding in North Tower

Other characters
Mr Rivers - Darrell's father, a surgeon
Mrs Rivers - Darrell's mother
Mrs Lacey - Gwendoline's mother
Miss Winter - Gwendoline's former governess
Charlie Jones - Jo's father. Wealthy, vulgar and has a "fog horn" voice
Mrs Jones - Jo's mother. Embarrassed by her husband, but "dripping" with jewellery.
Dr and Mrs Leyton - parents.

References

1951 British novels
Novels by Enid Blyton
Methuen Publishing books
1951 children's books